is a Japanese light novelist. Table Tennis was the best prize winner in the third  in the novel category held by Enterbrain in 2003.

Works 
 
 
 Bad! Daddy
 
 
 
 
 
 Manuscript Screening Boy and Manuscript Submitting Girl

References

21st-century Japanese novelists
Writers from Fukushima Prefecture
Toyo University alumni
Living people
Year of birth missing (living people)